Robert Douglas Christian (born November 14, 1968) is a former American football fullback who played ten seasons in the National Football League (NFL) for the Chicago Bears, the Carolina Panthers, and the Atlanta Falcons from 1992 to 2002. He was selected by the Carolina Panthers in the 1995 NFL Expansion Draft.

College career 
Christian played college football for Northwestern University where he set records (since broken) for career rushing, single season rushing, and single game all-purpose yards.

Professional career 
Christian played with Chicago Bears and Carolina Panthers prior to signing with Atlanta in 1997 and had 831 yards and 12 touchdowns on 193 carries in 135 games, including 85 starts. He had 230 receptions for 2,048 yards and seven touchdowns. Christian retired on March 13, 2003, after 11 seasons in the NFL.

Current career 
After spending time training and guiding aspiring athletes with TCBOOST Sports Performance, founded by his brother Tommy, he is now following his dream as a captain flying for Brazos Valley Air Charter, an on-demand air charter company serving Tuxedo Air - a membership flight provider for the energy corridor - Tulsa, Oklahoma City, Dallas, Fort Worth, Houston, Austin, Midland/Odessa, Carlsbad.

References

External links 
Bob Christian NFL Football Statistics - Pro-Football

1968 births
Living people
People from Florissant, Missouri
Players of American football from Missouri
American football fullbacks
Northwestern Wildcats football players
Chicago Bears players
Carolina Panthers players
Atlanta Falcons players
Sportspeople from St. Louis County, Missouri
Ed Block Courage Award recipients